Sarma (Turkish for wrapped; Cyrillic spelling: Сарма), commonly marketed in the English-speaking world as stuffed grape leaves, stuffed vine leaves, or stuffed cabbage leaves, is a food in Southeastern European and Ottoman cuisine made of vegetable leaves rolled around a filling of grains (such as rice), minced meat, or both. The vegetable leaves may be cabbage, patience dock, collard, grapevine, kale or chard leaves. Sarma is part of the broader category of stuffed dishes known as dolma.

Terminology and etymology

Sarma is a Turkish word meaning 'wrapped'.

In Armenian, they are called մսով տերեւափաթաթ (missov derevapatat), տերեւի տոլմա (derevi dolma) and տերեւի սարմա (derevi sarma). In Greek they are generally called ντολμάδες (dolmades) but may also be known as γιαπράκια (yaprakia), γιαπράκια γιαλαντζί (yaprakia yalandzi), ντολμαδάκια (dolmadakia), ντολμαδάκια γιαλαντζί (dolmadakia yalandzi), σαρμάδες (sarmadhes), or σαρμαδάκια (sarmadhakia).

In Bulgarian, Macedonian and Romanian, cabbage and grapevine leaves are not usually differentiated.

Stuffed chard leaves are called pazı dolması in Turkey and dolmas de pazi by Sephardi Jews who settled in Argentina.

Background
A grapevine leaf roll is a dish consisting of cooked grapevine leaves wrapped around a variety of fillings. Stuffed vine leaves without meat are sometimes called yalancı dolma, which means "liar's dolma" in Turkish. Vişneli yalancı dolması is a variation of stuffed vine leaves where the rice is seasoned with cinnamon, allspice and mint. The dolmas are slowly cooked together with morello cherries (vişne), and plums may be used also.

Vine leaves may also be used to wrap stuffed celery root. Before wrapping, the celery root is stuffed with rice that has been seasoned with cinnamon, salt, pepper, allspice, pine nuts and sugar. (This type of rice is called iç pilav.) Dried fruits like fig and apricot may be added to the rice mixture before the celery root is stuffed, wrapped and baked in the oven. Some variations may include quince.

Regional and national variants

Albania
In Albania, sarme is cigar-shaped and is often made in the northern regions, but can be found throughout. It is typically made of cabbage or grape leaves and filled with meat, rice, and spices. It can be served with yogurt or a yogurt-based drink. It can be a meal for special occasions or during the winter. In southern Albania, a lemon slice can be added while cooking the stuffing.

Bulgaria 

In Bulgaria, besides the two main rolled varieties—cabbage sarma (usually eaten in winter) and vine sarma (in spring and summer)—there is also a layered variety called drob sarma (дроб сарма, literally 'liver sarma'). Drob sarma is a dish of finely chopped offal (liver and lung), rice, browned onions and herbs, baked in an oven, and after a while covered with a mixture of eggs and yoghurt and baked again. The dish may be covered or even wrapped in fat netting before being baked. All sarma dishes can be served with fresh yoghurt on the side.

Croatia
In Croatia sarma is common throughout the country though there are regional variations. Sarma is always a meat dish. Croatian sarma is filled with the combination of beef and pork and rice and the sarma is always wrapped in sauerkraut leaves. In some regions cabbage leaves are used. There are many regional variations. Sinjski arambašići, from Sinj, is ground beef wrapped in sauerkraut leaf with no grains and no pork. Sarma is a winter staple and is also traditionally served on New Year's Eve.

Cyprus
In Cyprus koupepia are made with ground beef and pork, rice and a tomato and cinnamon sauce all wrapped in a grape leaf.

Romania and Moldova 

In Romania and Moldova, sarmale are popular in all historical regions, Moldavia, Transylvania, and Wallachia. This original Turkish dish slowly became integrated into Romania's culture after the Ottoman Empire conquered the Roman Empire which Romania was a part of. Sarmale are a central part of Romanian cuisine and are the national dish of Romania. Each usually consists of minced pork, rice,  onion, eggs, thyme and dill rolled in a leaf, usually a cabbage leaf. The baking dish is lined with chopped cabbage and sauerkraut layered with bacon or pork belly and the cabbage rolls, then topped with more sauerkraut and dill sprigs. The cooking water is poured over the assembled tray, a mixture of sauerkraut juice and seasonings. It is typically accompanied by mămăligă (polenta) and smântână (sour cream). It is a traditional dish for Easter and Christmas meals.

Serbia

In Serbia a vegetarian version of stuffed cabbage rolls is one of the dishes that can be eaten during the observance of Lent and before the Christmas.

Amasya and Tokat, Turkey

In the Turkish provinces of Amasya and Tokat, sarma is prepared in a style similar to maklouba, with different fillings. One version made with fava beans is called bakla sarma. The filling for this variant from Amasya is made with dried fava beans and a coarsely ground wheat called yarma cooked in a seasoned tomato sauce. The wrapped sarma are layered over bone-in lamb chops and simmered slowly in the cooking liquid. The finished dish is served upside down. A similar variation from Tokat is stuffed with a lentil, bulgur and chickpea filling. Homemade red pepper paste may be substituted for some of the tomato paste.

See also

 Buntil
 Cabbage roll
 Ladera
 Gołąbki
 Holishkes
 List of cabbage dishes
 List of stuffed dishes

References

External links

 
 Sarma made in Bosnia
 Sarma made in Serbia
 Sarma made in Romania

Arab cuisine
Cabbage dishes
Greek cuisine
Levantine cuisine
Balkan cuisine
Ottoman cuisine
Stuffed vegetable dishes
Turkish cuisine dolmas and sarmas
Bulgur dishes
Bacon dishes
Christmas food
Easter food
Moldovan cuisine
Armenian cuisine
Azerbaijani cuisine
Lenten foods
Iranian cuisine
Cuisine of Georgia (country)
Sephardi Jewish cuisine
Sephardi Jewish culture in Argentina
Mizrahi Jewish cuisine
Romani cuisine